Posyolok VI Kongressa Kominterna is a rural locality (a settlement) in Vishnyovsky Selsoviet, Rubtsovsky District, Altai Krai, Russia. The population was 196 as of 2013. There are 3 streets.

Geography 
The settlement is located 42 km southeast of Rubtsovsk (the district's administrative centre) by road. Vishnyovka is the nearest rural locality.

References 

Rural localities in Rubtsovsky District